Gillian de Greenlaw (born 21 June 1950) is an Australian former swimmer. She competed in the women's 100 metre butterfly at the 1964 Summer Olympics.

References

External links
 

1950 births
Living people
Olympic swimmers of Australia
Swimmers at the 1964 Summer Olympics
Place of birth missing (living people)
Australian female butterfly swimmers